Scorpidium is a genus of mosses belonging to the family Amblystegiaceae.

The genus has almost cosmopolitan distribution.

Species:
 Scorpidium cossonii Hedenäs, 1989
 Scorpidium revolvens Rubers, 1989
 Scorpidium scorpioides Limpricht, 1899

References

Amblystegiaceae
Moss genera